Molepolole Airport  was an airport serving Molepolole, Botswana.

Google Earth Historical Imagery (September 2002) shows a  dirt runway. Current Google Maps imagery shows the runway overbuilt with buildings and a large parking area.

See also

Transport in Botswana
List of airports in Botswana

References

External links 
OpenStreetMap - Molepolole
OurAirports - Molepolole

Defunct airports
Airports in Botswana